WINO (91.9 FM) is a community radio station broadcasting at 91.9 MHz, licensed to Watkins Glen, New York, and on W201CD 88.1 MHz, licensed to Ithaca, New York. The station studios are in downtown Ithaca.

History
In 2002, Ithaca Community Radio, Inc. obtained a FCC license for a translator on 88.1 FM in Ithaca. Because these have to re-broadcast full powered stations and ICR at this time did not own one, they at first re-broadcast WEOS and then later WSQX. In October 2007, they applied for a full powered FM license for Watkins Glen, as none were available for Ithaca proper. And then in June 2012, they completed their studios based in Clinton House in downtown Ithaca and finally went on the air as a community owned and operated station whose programming serves Tompkins and Schuyler counties.

Programming
The station features a variety of programming during the day, including locally produced programs and syndicated programs from Pacifica Radio and others.

Translator
In addition to the main station, WINO is relayed by an additional translator to widen its broadcast area.

See also
List of community radio stations in the United States

References

External links

INO (FM)
Community radio stations in the United States
Tompkins County, New York
Schuyler County, New York
Radio stations established in 2011
2011 establishments in New York (state)